STK12 may refer to:
 Aurora B kinase, an enzyme
 IkappaB kinase, an enzyme